Xenies is a village and a community in the municipal unit of Vouprasia, Elis, southwestern Greece. At the 2001 census, the population of Xenies was 81 for the village and 176 for the municipal district, which includes the small villages Kalyvakia and Palaiochora. Xenies is situated in the hills on the northeastern shore of the Pineios reservoir.

Population

External links
 Xenies on the GTP Travel Pages

See also

List of settlements in Elis

References

Populated places in Elis
Vouprasia